Little Princess is a 2022 Philippine television drama series broadcast by GMA Network. Directed by L.A. Madridejos, it stars Jo Berry in the title role. It premiered on January 10, 2022 on the network's Afternoon Prime line up replacing Stories from the Heart. The series concluded on April 22, 2022 with a total of 73 episodes. It was replaced by Raising Mamay in its timeslot.

The series is streaming online on YouTube.

Cast and characters
Lead cast
 Jo Berry as Princess R. Montivano

Supporting cast
 Juancho Trivino as Damien Santiago
 Rodjun Cruz as Jaxon Pineda
 Angelika Dela Cruz as Elise Reyes
 Jestoni Alarcon as Marcus V. Montivano
 Geneva Cruz as Odessa Hidalgo-Montivano
 Jenine Desiderio as Sunshine Pineda
 Gabrielle Hahn as Adrianna Ilustre
 Therese Malvar as Masoy
 Tess Antonio as Winona
 Lander Vera Perez as Donald Santiago
 Chuckie Dreyfus as Fermin Garcia
 Marx Topacio as Aaron
 Melissa Avelino as Melania
 Kaloy Tingcungco as Caloy
 Hannah Precillas as Hannah
 Sheemee Buenaobra as Macy
 Lala Vinzon as Jewel
 Cherry Malvar as Whitney

Production
Principal photography commenced in October 2021.

Episodes
<onlyinclude>
<onlyinclude>

Ratings
According to AGB Nielsen Philippines' Nationwide Urban Television Audience Measurement People in television homes, the pilot episode of Little Princess earned a 5.9% rating.

References

External links
 
 

2022 Philippine television series debuts
2022 Philippine television series endings
Filipino-language television shows
GMA Network drama series
Television shows set in the Philippines